A breba (or more commonly breva in Spanish, and sometimes as taqsh) is a fig that develops on a common fig tree in the spring on the previous year's shoot growth.  In contrast, the main fig crop develops on the current year's shoot growth and ripens in late summer or fall. Breba figs of certain varieties don't always develop the rich flavor that the main crop has.  Growers of those varieties frequently discard the brebas before they ripen to encourage growth of the main crop because the main crop is generally superior in both quantity and quality to the breba crop. Other cultivars such as Black Mission, Croisic, and Ventura produce good breba crops.

In some cold climates the breba crop is often destroyed by spring frosts. However, in other areas, the summer may be too cool for the main crop to set so the breba crop is the only crop that will ripen.

References